This article displays the rosters for the teams competing at the 2021 Women's Afrobasket. Each team has to submit 12 players.

Age and club as of 18 September 2021.

Group A

Cameroon
A 15-player roster was announced on 10 August 2021. The final squad was revealed on 15 September 2021.

Cape Verde
The roster was announced on 16 September 2021.

Kenya
The roster was announced on 14 September 2021.

Group B

Angola
The roster was announced on 14 September 2021.

Mozambique

Nigeria
A 13-player roster was announced on 14 September 2021.

Group C

Egypt
The roster was announced on 14 September 2021.

Guinea

Senegal
The roster was announced on 8 September 2021.

Group D

Ivory Coast
The roster was announced on 13 September 2021.

Mali
The roster was announced on 15 September 2021.

Tunisia
The roster was announced on 15 September 2021.

References

External links
Official website

Squads
AfroBasket Women squads